Rugiluclivina is a genus of beetles in the family Carabidae, containing the following species:

 Rugiluclivina alutacea (Lesne, 1896)
 Rugiluclivina julieni (Lesne, 1896)
 Rugiluclivina leonina Balkenohl, 1999
 Rugiluclivina promineoculata Balkenohl, 2015
 Rugiluclivina puncticollis Balkenohl, 1996
 Rugiluclivina reticulata Balkenohl, 1996
 Rugiluclivina rugicollis Balkenohl, 1996
 Rugiluclivina wrasei Balkenohl, 1996

References

Scaritinae